Intragna is a comune (municipality) in the Province of Verbano-Cusio-Ossola in the Italian region Piedmont, located about  northeast of Turin and about  northeast of Verbania.

Intragna borders the following municipalities: Aurano, Caprezzo, Miazzina, Premeno, Vignone.

References

Cities and towns in Piedmont